Mike Kirkland (born June 29, 1954) is a former American football quarterback who played three seasons for the Baltimore Colts in the National Football League (NFL).

As a 13-year-old, Kirkland won the National Punt, Pass, and Kick competition, which included a 57-yard pass. A fifth-round pick in 1976 NFL Draft after played college football at the University of Arkansas, Kirkland completed 19 of 41 passes for 211 yards and one touchdown and eight interceptions in the 1978 season.  As third-string quarterback, he started two NFL games, including the 1978 opener, when the top two players were injured. Kirkland was also a kicker and punter, helping to keep him on the Baltimore roster as a backup quarterback and special teams player.

Kirkland and Scott Bull competed for the starting quarterback position at Arkansas and were both drafted into the NFL in 1976 and played in the league.

References

1954 births
Living people
American football quarterbacks
Arkansas Razorbacks football players
Baltimore Colts players
People from Pasadena, Texas
Sportspeople from Harris County, Texas
Players of American football from Texas